John Charles Titman (born 26 January 1951) is an Australian former motorcycle speedway rider who was Australian Champion in 1977.

Biography
Born  in Brisbane, Queensland, Titman initially worked as a mechanic, making his speedway debut at the Brisbane Exhibition Ground in April 1968. He made his British League debut with Halifax Dukes in 1972, and also made his international debut for Australia that year against the British Lions. In 1973 he averaged 6.92 from 38 matches, and became a regular member of the Australian team. In 1973 he finished in 7th place (with John Boulger) in the Australian qualifying round of the World Pairs championship. He also raced in Poland and New Zealand. He moved on to the Exeter Falcons in 1975.

Titman won the Australian Solo Championship in 1977 on his home track, the Brisbane Exhibition Ground. He also finished runner-up in the Australian championship to Phil Crump in 1975 at the Sydney Showground Speedway, and again in 1986 at the Pioneer Park Speedway in Ayr behind fellow Queenslander Troy Butler.

He signed for the Leicester Lions in 1978, becoming club captain in 1979. After falling to third in the Lions averages in 1981 and being stripped of the captaincy, he was transfer listed at the end of the season, and moved on to the Hackney Hawks in 1982. He moved on again in 1984 to the Wimbledon Dons, and this was his final season in British speedway.

During his career, Titman made the World Final on two occasions, finishing 8th in 1978 and 9th in 1979. Titman also rode in longtrack speedway, reaching the world final in 1983 and 1984. After returning home at the end of 1984, Titman continued to ride, captaining the Australian national team for a further three years.

In 2022, he was inducted into the Speedway Australia's Hall of Fame.

Career record

All figures relate to the British League.

World Final Appearances

Individual World Championship
 1978 -  London, Wembley Stadium - 9th - 7pts
 1979 -  Chorzów, Silesian Stadium - 12th - 5pts

World Pairs Championship
 1979 -  Vojens, Speedway Center (with Phil Crump) - 4th - 19pts (6)

World Longtrack Championship

Finalist

 1983  Marianske Lazne 9pts (11th)
 1984  Herxheim 11pts (10th)

References

1951 births
Living people
Australian speedway riders
Exeter Falcons riders
Hackney Hawks riders
Halifax Dukes riders
Leicester Lions riders
Wimbledon Dons riders
Motorcycle racers from Brisbane
Individual Speedway Long Track World Championship riders